Ateshkuh (also Romanized as Āteshkūh, Ātash Kūh, and Ateshkooh; also known as Ātish Kūh) is a village in Baqerabad Rural District, in the Central District of Mahallat County, Markazi Province, Iran. At the 2006 census, its population was 23, in 8 families.

References 

Populated places in Mahallat County